Drapers' Academy is a secondary school for girls and boys, from years 7 to 13 sixth form with academy status, located in Harold Hill near Romford, Greater London, England. It was the first academy to be established in the London Borough of Havering.

History
It was established in September 2010 under the joint sponsorship of the Drapers' Company and Queen Mary, University of London.  It is located on the site of the former King's Wood School.  Its future was thrown into doubt on 7 July 2010 by the government's announcement of cuts to the national school building programme, but after reconsideration was given approval on 6 August.

Description
For two years the Academy occupied one of the original King's Wood buildings while the new buildings were being constructed and the extensive 23 acre grounds re-landscaped.  This work is now completed and the new buildings opened on 3 September 2012.  Queen Elizabeth II (a Freeman of the Drapers' Company) officially opened the buildings on 26 October 2012.

The Academy is designed to be a 'Harold Hill School for Harold Hill Families.'  The Academy specialisms are science and mathematics but a broad syllabus is taught.

The Academy is also home to a Sixth Form hosting 200 students.

Drapers' Academy is a member school of the Drapers' Multi-Academy Trust, along with Drapers' Maylands Primary School, Drapers' Pyrgo Priory School, Drapers' Brookside Infant School and Drapers' Brookside Junior School.

References

External links
 Drapers' Academy

Academies in the London Borough of Havering
Secondary schools in the London Borough of Havering
Queen Mary University of London